Leslie Hewitt Gay (24 March 1871 – 1 November 1949) was a first-class cricketer who played for Cambridge University, Hampshire, Somerset and England. As a footballer, he played for Cambridge University, the Corinthians and England.

Education 
Leslie Gay was educated at Marlborough, Brighton College and Clare College, Cambridge.

Cricket career
An intermittent cricketer who had left the first-class game by 1904, Gay kept wicket for Cambridge in the Varsity match against Oxford University in 1892 and 1893, and after four games for Somerset in 1894 he was picked for the 1894-95 tour to Australia under Andrew Stoddart. Chosen only for the first Test match, he scored 33 and four and took three catches with one stumping. He then disappeared from first-class cricket until a brief nine-match return with Hampshire in 1900. Gay's cousin, Kingsmill Key, captained Surrey in the 1890s.

Football career
As a football player, he represented Cambridge University as goalkeeper against Oxford University in 1892 and appeared for England against Scotland in 1893 and 1894, and against Wales in 1894. In 1900, Gay joined Southampton as reserve to fellow England goalkeeper, Jack Robinson, although he never played for the first team.

He also represented Devon at golf.

Military service
Gay served in World War I as a captain in the South Lancashire Regiment and then as a major in the Royal Defence Corps.

See also
List of English cricket and football players

References

External links

1871 births
1949 deaths
People educated at Brighton College
Sportspeople from Brighton
Alumni of Clare College, Cambridge
Cambridge University cricketers
England Test cricketers
English cricketers
Hampshire cricketers
Somerset cricketers
English footballers
Cambridge University A.F.C. players
Corinthian F.C. players
England international footballers
Marylebone Cricket Club cricketers
Gentlemen cricketers
North v South cricketers
Southampton F.C. players
West of England cricketers
Oxford and Cambridge Universities cricketers
Association football goalkeepers
A. E. Stoddart's XI cricketers
British Army personnel of World War I
South Lancashire Regiment officers
Royal Defence Corps officers
Military personnel from Sussex
Wicket-keepers